Tina Pisnik (born 19 February 1981) is a former professional tennis player from Slovenia. Pisnik turned professional since 1999. Pisnik's highest singles ranking was world number 29, which she reached on 12 January 2004. Her highest doubles ranking was world number 63 on 3 April 2000. She won one singles title and two doubles titles on the WTA tour.

Biography
Pisnik is a baseliner who plays a serve-and-volley style game on grass. Her father Boris is a former Slovenian national team soccer player and a soccer coach and he traveled with her on tour. Her mother Saska is an economic technician. Other sports interests include basketball and soccer. She moved to United States in 2015 and was a High performance director at CPAC, Lincolnshire until early 2020. She owns a business called Smash Tennis and currently coaches privately at Bradenton Tennis Center in Bradenton, Florida.

WTA career finals

Singles: 1 (1–0)

Doubles: 3 (2–1)

ITF finals (4–1)

Singles (1–0)

Doubles (3–1)

External links
 
 
 

Living people
Slovenian female tennis players
1981 births
Sportspeople from Maribor